Dasher High School is a historic school in Valdosta, Georgia, United States that served African Americans.

Inscribed 1929 in its cornerstone, the school was a high school for African Americans. James L. Lomax, a leader in African American education in Valdosta, served as the school's principal until his retirement in 1967. His adopted son Louis L. Lomax, the first African American broadcast journalist, attended Dasher High School. He was a civil rights activist and died in a car accident in 1970.

The school's football team won a Georgia Interscholastic Association Class A football championship in 1953.

The building was listed on the National Register of Historic Places on April 18, 1985. It is located at 900 South Troup Street.

See also

 National Register of Historic Places listings in Lowndes County, Georgia

References

Education in Lowndes County, Georgia
High schools in Georgia (U.S. state)
Buildings and structures in Lowndes County, Georgia
Valdosta, Georgia
School buildings on the National Register of Historic Places in Georgia (U.S. state)
School buildings completed in 1929
National Register of Historic Places in Lowndes County, Georgia
1929 establishments in Georgia (U.S. state)